Smoke 'em if you got 'em is slang for "do what you want, if you have the means".

Music
 Smoke 'Em If You Got 'Em (The Reverend Horton Heat album), 1990
 Smoke 'Em If You Got 'Em (Cypress Hill EP), 2004
"Smoke 'Em If Ya Got 'Em", song on 2006 Parkway Drive album Killing with a Smile
 "Smoke 'Em", song on 1996 Fun Lovin' Criminals album Come Find Yourself

Cinema
 Smoke 'Em If You Got 'Em (film), a 1988 Australian film